New Year's Day is a 1989 American comedy-drama film written and directed by Henry Jaglom. It was entered into the main competition at the 46th Venice International Film Festival.

Plot

Set entirely inside a New York City apartment on a snowy New Years Day, Drew is a recently divorced, middle-aged Hollywood writer/director who arrives back in New York looking for a path to start his life over and upon arriving at his old apartment, finds three young women residing there until the end of the day. They are the free-spirited Lucy, a multi-career woman and part-time actress who wants to move to Hollywood to start her life over; Annie is a photographer and Lucy's best friend who wants to move to L.A. with Lucy, but is unsure at what she wants to do with her life; Winona is a 30-year-old magazine editor who feels her biological clock ticking and wants to start a family. An assortment of people soon arrive at the apartment for a party where they talk amongst each other about their stance in life in which Drew sees the inspiration from the conversations on deciding to start his life over.

Cast 
Maggie Jakobson as Lucy
Gwen Welles as Annie
Melanie Winter as Winona
Henry Jaglom as Drew
David Duchovny as Billy
Miloš Forman as Lazlo
Michael Emil as Dr. Stadthagen
Tracy Reiner as Marjorie
James DePreist as Lucy's shrink

References

External links

1989 films
1989 comedy-drama films
Films directed by Henry Jaglom
American comedy-drama films
1980s English-language films
1980s American films